"Bedbugs and Ballyhoo" is a single by Echo & the Bunnymen that was released in 1987. It was the third single from their 1987 eponymous album. The single was released as a 7-inch single and a 12-inch single by WEA Records and by Sire Records.

Overview
The song was first released as the B-side of the 12" version of the 1985 "Bring on the Dancing Horses" single. It was re-recorded for the 1987 eponymous album.

The B-side of the WEA 7-inch single is "Over You", and that of the Sire 7-inch single is a live recording of a cover version of Lou Reed's "Run, Run, Run". The WEA 12-inch single has the track "New Direction" added to the B-side; the Sire 12-inch single has a club remix of the title track and the LP version of it on the A-side, and the B-side includes additional live performances of The Rolling Stones' "Paint It, Black" and Television's "Friction".

"Bedbugs and Ballyhoo" and "Over You" were produced by Laurie Latham, and "Run, Run, Run", "Paint It, Black" and "Friction", which were recorded live at the Karen in Gothenburg for the Swedish National Radio programme Bommen, were produced by Lars Aldman.

"Bedbugs and Ballyhoo" was covered by the American group Voyager One on their 2002 album Monster Zero.

Track listings
All tracks written by Will Sergeant, Ian McCulloch, Les Pattinson, and Pete de Freitas except where noted.

WEA 7-inch single (248135-7)
"Bedbugs and Ballyhoo"
"Over You"

WEA 12-inch single (248134-0)
"Bedbugs and Ballyhoo"
"Over You"
"New Direction"

Korova/WEA 12-inch EP (248150-CR)
"Bedbugs and Ballyhoo (Club Mix)"
"Bedbugs and Ballyhoo (LP Version)"
"Run, Run, Run" (Reed)
"Paint It, Black" (Jagger/Richards)
"Friction" (Tom Verlaine)

Sire 7-inch single (7-28113)
"Bedbugs and Ballyhoo"
"Run, Run, Run" (Lou Reed)

Sire 12-inch single (0-20838)
"Bedbugs and Ballyhoo (Club Mix)"
"Bedbugs and Ballyhoo (LP Version)"
"Run, Run, Run" (Reed)
"Paint It, Black" (Jagger/Richards)
"Friction" (Tom Verlaine)

Personnel

Musicians
Ian McCulloch – vocals, guitar
Will Sergeant – lead guitar
Les Pattinson – bass
Pete de Freitas – drums
Ray Manzarek – keyboards

Production
Laurie Latham – producer
Bruce Lampcovc – mixing
Ivan Ivan – remixing

References

External links
Lyrics at MTV.com
Promotional video on the band's official website

1987 singles
Echo & the Bunnymen songs
Songs written by Ian McCulloch (singer)
Songs written by Will Sergeant
Songs written by Les Pattinson
Songs written by Pete de Freitas
Sire Records singles
1987 songs